

See also

List of aircraft of the Hellenic Air Force

References

Based on the list of the Hellenic Air Force official website

Greece
History of the Hellenic Air Force
Greek military aircraft
Aircraft